"Rush Rush" is a song by American recording artist Paula Abdul, taken from her second studio album, Spellbound (1991). It was released on April 24, 1991, by Virgin Records as the lead single from the album. Written by Peter Lord and produced by Peter Lord and V. Jeffrey Smith (both members of the Family Stand), the song achieved success in the United States, where it topped the Billboard Hot 100, and became a worldwide hit.

Background
"Rush Rush" was a departure for Abdul stylistically, as it was her first ballad released as a single, following  the six uptempo singles from her debut LP; it was viewed as a rather risky strategy in kicking off her second album of new material Spellbound, but the decision was vindicated, as it was warmly received at retail.

First presented to Abdul as a demo by the Family Stand in 1990, she became intent on it becoming the first single. In late 1990 at Studio Masters, Abdul laid down a scratch vocal for the track, which was never intended to make it to the song's final mix, but the producers felt that its unpolished sound was needed to give the song its ingenuous tone, to match its subject matter and accompanying promotional video clip; it ended up on the final cut in March 1991. Lyrically, "Rush Rush" is about the desire for a lover who will give their all in a relationship.

Chart performances
"Rush Rush" debuted on the US Billboard Hot 100 at number 36 on May 11, 1991, and reached number one five weeks later, on June 15, 1991, remaining there for five consecutive weeks. At the time, it was the longest-running number one since Madonna's "Like a Virgin" spent six weeks at number one during 1984 and 1985. The song also spent five weeks atop the Billboard Adult Contemporary chart. The song was ranked as the 64th-most-successful song of the 1990s in the United States. In the United Kingdom, the song peaked at number six on the UK Singles Chart.

Music video
The video reimagines the 1955 James Dean/Natalie Wood film Rebel Without a Cause, including iconic location shots at Griffith Observatory, a black 1949 Mercury, and a climactic street race. With Keanu Reeves filling James Dean's role of Jim, opposite Abdul as Judy, several scenes from the movie are duplicated shot-for-shot. The video was directed by Stefan Würnitzer in April 1991 and produced by Karen Rohrbacher for Lucasfilm Commercial Productions. The British Top of the Pops aired an alternate version of the video, re-edited to contain more "performance shots" and less story. Many more shots of Paula dancing in the orange dress were present.

Track listings and formats

7-inch and cassette single
 "Rush Rush" (7-inch edit) – 4:19
 "Rush Rush" (dub mix) – 5:56

12-inch single
A1. "Rush Rush" (dub mix) – 5:56
B1. "Rush Rush" (album version) – 4:56 
B2. "Rush Rush" (7-inch edit) – 4:19

CD single
 "Rush Rush" (7-inch edit) – 4:19
 "Rush Rush" (album version) – 4:56
 "Rush Rush" (dub edit) – 5:56

Japanese mini-CD single
 "Rush Rush" – 4:20
 "Rush Rush" (dub mix) – 5:59

Charts

Weekly charts

Year-end charts

Decade-end charts

All-time charts

Certifications

Release history

Cover versions
 Eliana recorded the song for her album "Primavera" with the title "Como um Beijo em Noite de Luar" ("Like a Kiss on a Moonlight Night"). It was released as a single.
 Hong Kong singer Cass Phang (彭羚) recorded a Cantonese version "彷彿是初戀" (As If It's My First Love) released in 1992.
 MYMP covered the song on their 2008 album Now.
 Nicki Minaj used the strings piece from "Rush, Rush" in her song "Grand Piano".
 Tyra B interpolates the hook of the song in her 2007 song "Givin' Me a Rush".

See also
 List of European number-one airplay songs of the 1990s

References

1990 songs
1990s ballads
1991 singles
Billboard Hot 100 number-one singles
Cashbox number-one singles
Paula Abdul songs
Pop ballads
RPM Top Singles number-one singles
Virgin Records singles